Chamberlin Glacier is a glacier on the east side of Hemimont Plateau which flows northeast into Whirlwind Inlet about  southeast of Matthes Glacier, on the east coast of Graham Land.

History
Chamberlin Glacier was discovered by Sir Hubert Wilkins on a flight of December 20, 1928, and in 1940 was photographed from the air by the United States Antarctic Service. It was charted in 1947 by the Falkland Islands Dependencies Survey, who named it for American glaciologist and geomorphologist Thomas C. Chamberlin, educator and professor of geology at the Universities of Wisconsin and Chicago.

See also
 List of glaciers in the Antarctic
 Glaciology

References 

Glaciers of Graham Land
Bowman Coast